"Eight Arms to Hold You"' was a song recorded for the soundtrack to the film The Goonies. The title is borrowed from the working title of the Beatles' second movie, "Help". The song was recorded by a studio group called Goon Squad that was put together by producer Arthur Baker. It was utilized in a scene in the film where the character Data puts a loud tape recorder (blaring the song) into the mouth of an octopus to fend it off. The scene was deleted from the film and the song did not appear in the theatrical release of the film. (The song is still heard, although barely audible, during the scene when Chunk first enters the Walsh residence) The soundtrack producers had anticipated the track would be a big hit and so even though it wasn't actually in the film, a single was released on both 12" and 7" vinyl. It reached number one on the Billboard Hot Dance Club Play chart and peaked at number eighty on the Hot R&B Singles chart.

The "octopus scene" was replaced for broadcast on the Disney Channel, in order to make up for time removed due to objectionable content. It was also included in a deleted scenes featurette in the 2001 DVD release.

Track listings

12" single
 Vocal
 Bonus Beat
 Dub

7" single
 Edit
 Dub

References

Songs written for films
1985 songs
1985 singles
Songs written by Arthur Baker (musician)